There are many islands directly off the coast of Hainan Island, the southernmost province in China. This article lists them. There are also groups of disputed islands located hundreds of kilometres away that are within Hainan, the administrative area, but not actually part of Hainan, the province. Those islands are not within the scope of this article.

References

External links

Hainan